Hipposauroides is an extinct genus of biarmosuchian therapsids from the Late Permian of South Africa.

References

Biarmosuchians
Prehistoric therapsid genera
Lopingian synapsids of Africa
Fossil taxa described in 1952
Taxa named by Lieuwe Dirk Boonstra
Lopingian genus first appearances
Lopingian genus extinctions